Nicola Kuleski (born 7 May 1996 in Sydney Australia) is an Australian / Macedonian (he has dual citizenship) professional footballer who last played as central midfielder for Sydney FC in the A-league. He currently play for Rockdale Ilinden in the National Premier Leagues NSW.

Club career
Being born to a father who was a professional football player himself, Nicola started playing football at a very young age (when he was only 4 years old), and he first started training by the local club Marconi Stallions at the age of 7.

He primarily plays as a central midfielder, but he is also comfortable playing attacking or defensive midfield. His great ball skills and vision of the game make him a valuable asset to any team.

Sydney FC
In 2015 Kuleski joined Sydney FC where he started off by playing for the youth team, where he also served as  co captain in the 2016–17 season. On 8 April 2017 he also made his debut for the first team of Sydney, coming in in the 80' minute as a substitute for Aaron Calver, in the A-League encounter against Wellington Phoenix which finished 1–1.

Sydney Olympic
On 11 October 2017, it was announced that Kuleski would be leaving Sydney FC to join NPL1 team Sydney Olympic for their upcoming 2018 season.

International career
Being born in Australia to Macedonian parents, Nicola was originally eligible to play for both - the Australian and Macedonian national team on international level, and he made his decision at the time to represent Macedonia. He started playing for Macedonia's U17 and U19 national teams. He is still eligible to represent both Australia and Macedonia at senior level.

On 5 September 2015, Kuleski made his debut for Macedonia U21 in a friendly against Australia U23 which Macedonia won with 3:1. Nicola played the game as a starter and played a solid game against his home country, he got substituted in the 81' minute.

Personal life
Nicola was born to a Macedonian father - Blagoja Kuleski who was A professional football player, having played the former Yugloslav First League and for several Australian NSL football clubs throughout his 20-year football career.

Aside from playing football, Nicola is also a part-time student at the Macquarie University doing a Bachelor of Science degree in Information Technology.

References

External links

1996 births
Living people
Soccer players from Sydney
Australian people of Macedonian descent
Association football midfielders
Australian soccer players
Macedonian footballers
North Macedonia under-21 international footballers
Rockdale Ilinden FC players
Sydney FC players
National Premier Leagues players
A-League Men players